The Schlatenkees is a glacier in the Venediger Group that is in the core zone of the High Tauern National Park, east of the Großvenediger. 
It is in the East Tyrolean community of Matrei in Osttirol. 
The exposure is mainly to the east, in the highest area also to the south-east.

Description

The relatively flat Accumulation zone of the glacier is known as the Upper Keesboden.
It is framed by the highest peaks of the Venediger group: Großvenediger: , Kleinvenediger: , Hohes Aderl: , Rainerhorn: , Schwarze Wand:  and Hoher Zaun: . 

A partial glacier flows into the Lower Keesboden from the south, coming from the Kristallwand. 
The northern part of the tongue is largely free of debris, while the southern end of the tongue, which forms the end of the stream coming from the Kristallwand, is completely covered by debris.

At the end of the tongue there was a clearly visible glacier gate from which the Schlatenbach exited until the summer of 2014. 
The Schlatenbach joins the Vilhabenbach in the valley floor of the Gschlösstal, and these form the Gschlössbach, which drains into the Black Sea via the Tauernbach, Isel, Drau and Danube. 

The glacier gate collapsed in the late summer of 2014, there has been no glacier front since 2017.
The Lower Keesboden is furrowed and rich in crevices, instead of the former arch, large, deep funnels show up. 
For this reason, a warning is issued against stepping on the ice - the edges can be brittle and there are often wide gaps in the edge towards the rock. 
Slipping on the rubble-strewn rock carries the risk of slipping under the ice sheet. 
In 2019, the retreat was almost .
In 2019, the retreat was almost .

At the last peak of the glacier around 1850, the glacier still flowed over the steep step below the current end of the tongue down to the floor of the Gschlöss valley.
It completely crossed the valley and reached up  on the opposite slope. 
Since then, the glacier has continuously shrunk apart from brief interruptions. 
The Innergschlöß glacier path was built in 1978 in an area that was then still covered by the glacier, now on the slope below the glacier, .

Gallery

References

Sources

Further reading 
Alpenvereinskarte Blatt 36, 1:25.000, Venedigergruppe. 

Glaciers of Austria
Venediger Group
Glaciers of the Alps
Geography of East Tyrol